This is the list of notable stars in the constellation Carina, sorted by decreasing brightness.

This constellation's Bayer designations (Greek-letter star names) were given while it was still considered part of the constellation of Argo Navis. After Argo Navis was broken up into Carina, Vela, and Puppis, these Greek-letter designations were kept, so that Carina does not have a full complement of Greek-letter designations. For example, since Argo Navis's gamma star went to Vela, there is no Gamma Carinae.

See also
List of stars by constellation

Notes

References

List
Carina